Real Canamy Tlayacapan was a Mexican football club that played in the Liga Premier, was the official reserve team of Sporting Canamy.

History 
In 2016, Sporting Canamy acquired an expansion place in the Liga Premier de Ascenso, so the franchise participating in the Liga de Nuevos Talentos was put on hiatus.  

On May 23, 2019, Gustavo Navarro Zuñiga, Sporting Canamy's chairman, announced the creation of a new team called Real Canamy Tlayacapan, that plays in the Serie B. The team was created to retake the franchise that was on hiatus since 2016.

The team was named Real Canamy Tlayacapan in honor of the fans coming from that town in the state of Morelos, however, the team shared the Estadio Olímpico de Oaxtepec with the club's main team. In 2020 Real Canamy was dissolved due to financial problems caused by the COVID-19 pandemic, also the main team, Sporting Canamy, was put on hiatus during the 2020–21 season for the same reason.

See also
Sporting Canamy
Football in Mexico

References

Football clubs in Morelos
Association football clubs established in 2019
2019 establishments in Mexico
Liga Premier de México